Capitol theater (or theatre) may refer to:

Theaters
Capital Theatre (Bendigo), Australia
Beijing Capital Theatre, China
Capital Repertory Theatre, Albany, New York, US
Capital Theater (Ely, Nevada), US

Other uses
Capital Theatre (band), a New Zealand rock band

See also
Capitol Theater (disambiguation)